Linxiang is a county-level city in Hunan province, China, it is under the administration of the prefecture-level city of Yueyang. Linxiang is located at the northeastern edge of Hunan province, on the southeastern (right) bank of the Yangtze River, which lies to the east of the city proper. Linxiang is bordered to the northwest and the north across the Yangtze by Jianli County and Honghu City of Hubei, to the east by Chibi City, Chongyang and Tongcheng Counties of Hubei, to the south and southwest by Yueyang County, to the west by Yunxi District. The city has 3 subdistricts and 10 towns under its jurisdiction. the government seat is Chang'an.

Administrative divisions
After an adjustment of township-level administrative divisions of Linxiang on 24 November 2015, Linxiang has 3 subdistricts and 10 towns under its jurisdiction.

3 subdistricts
 Chang'an, Linxiang
 Taokuang
 Wulipai, Linxiang

10 towns
 Baiyangtian
 Changtang, Linxiang
 Huanggai
 Jiangnan, Linxiang
 Nieshi
 Tandu, Linxiang
 Taolin
 Yanglousi
 Zhanqiao
 Zhongfang, Linxiang

Climate

References

www.xzqh.org 

 
County-level divisions of Hunan
Yueyang
Populated places on the Yangtze River
Cities in Hunan